Agnaldo Cordeiro Pereira, shortly Agnaldo (born January 25, 1975, in Paranacity, Paraná) is a former Brazilian footballer who played as a forward.

Club career

In August 2002 he signed a one-year contract (with the option for a two-year extension) with CSKA Sofia in the A PFG. He also played for Anyang LG Cheetahs of the South Korean K League.

Honours
Campeonato Paranaense in 1992 with Londrina
Belgian League in 1994-95 with R.S.C. Anderlecht
Campeonato Baiano in 1996, 1997 with Vitória
Campeonato do Nordeste in 1997 with Vitória
Campeonato Gaúcho in 1999 with Grêmio
Copa Sul-Minas in 1999 with Grêmio
Campeonato Carioca in 2002 with Fluminense
Campeonato Cearense in 2004 with Fortaleza

References

 Agnaldo at Sambafoot
 
 Agnaldo Cordeiro at ZeroZero

1975 births
Brazilian footballers
Brazilian expatriate footballers
Association football forwards
Living people
R.S.C. Anderlecht players
América Futebol Clube (SP) players
Esporte Clube Vitória players
Grêmio Foot-Ball Porto Alegrense players
Fluminense FC players
PFC CSKA Sofia players
FC Seoul players
Associação Portuguesa de Desportos players
Fortaleza Esporte Clube players
Brasiliense Futebol Clube players
Figueirense FC players
Expatriate footballers in Belgium
Brazilian expatriate sportspeople in Bulgaria
Expatriate footballers in Bulgaria
Brazilian expatriate sportspeople in South Korea
Expatriate footballers in South Korea
First Professional Football League (Bulgaria) players
Sportspeople from Paraná (state)